Tralee Celtic are a former Gaelic Athletic Association club form Tralee in County Kerry, Ireland. They won 2 Hurling County Championship in 1903 and 1904.

County Championship winning captains

 1903: Chris Horan
 1904: Paddy Guerin

Former Gaelic Athletic Association clubs in Kerry
Gaelic games clubs in County Kerry
Hurling clubs in County Kerry
Celtic